"Do You See the Light (Looking For)" is a song by German Eurodance group Snap!, released in May 1993 as the fourth and final single from their second studio album, The Madman's Return (1992). It features American singer Niki Haris and received positive rewiews from music critics. The song reached number one in Finland, while peaking within the top 10 in Austria, Belgium, Denmark, Ireland, Netherlands, Switzerland and the UK. On MTV Europe, its accompanying music video received heavy rotation.

Background and release
The original version of the song "See the Light" features vocals by Thea Austin, a rap by Turbo B, and can be found on the 1992 Snap! album, The Madman's Return. Female vocals of this version of the song are often mistakenly reported to be by Penny Ford, a previous vocalist for Snap!. Remixes of "See the Light" were included on Snap!'s 1992 release "Rhythm Is a Dancer", which also feature vocals by Thea Austin.

This song is essentially a remix of their original song, "See the Light" with new lyrics written for the new front-woman Niki Haris, released in June 1993. "Do You See the Light (Snap! vs Plaything)", another remix, was released in August 2002.

Chart performance
"Do You See the Light (Looking For)" was a major hit on the charts in Europe, becoming one of the group's more successful songs. It peaked at number one in Finland and entered the top 10 in Austria, Belgium, Denmark, Ireland, the Netherlands, Switzerland and the United Kingdom. In the latter, the single peaked at number 10 during its first week on the UK Singles Chart on 6 June 1993. On the Eurochart Hot 100, it reached number nine, while reaching number three on the European Dance Radio Chart. Additionally, the song was a top-20 hit in Germany, Italy and Sweden. Outside Europe, "Do You See the Light (Looking For)" peaked at number 86 in Australia.

Critical reception
In his review of the song, Larry Flick from Billboard felt that "someone has clearly been listening very carefully to those great old Giorgio Moroder  records. Syncopated synth rhythms à la "The Chase" are plentiful on this bracing, rave-friendly romp." Arion Berger from Entertainment Weekly praised it as the album’s "finest moment", describing it as "lilting" and "as lush as Soul II Soul's best work, and even the sequences of mush-mouthed rapping can't dull its gloss." Music writer and columnist James Masterton stated, "With a bassline reminiscent of I Feel Love it is already a club smash". Pan-European magazine Music & Media noted that "this eagerly anticipated successor to the hugely successful Exterminate! is a bit different from previous efforts, mainly because it's somewhat ambient. It's extremely recognisable, though, and with a liberal dash of Giorgio Moroder era Donna Summer, it's likely to do very well on both the dancefloor and the airwaves." 

Alan Jones from Music Week rated the track four out of five, picking it as Pick of the Week. He complimented the new singer, Niki Haris, that "has settled in extraordinary well", and described it as "another typically tense and NRG-etically smacking workout (shades of Giorgio Moroder abound), with enough melody in the haunting title refrain to make it another winner over the store counter as well as on the nation's dancefloors." Tim Jeffery from the RM Dance Update wrote, "Introed by a very pop vocal and launching into a throbbing Hi-NRG grove, this is more commercial than their normal material. The production is a little lightweight, with the emphasis more on the melody than the bass and rhythm." He added, "Sure to be a chart hit, but not so big in the clubs as "Rhythm Is A Dancer"." Sian Pattenden from Smash Hits gave "Do You See the Light (Looking For)" three out of five, describing it as "a Hi-NRG disco-type thing with no stupid rhymes."

Music video
A music video was produced to promote the single, featuring Niki Haris. It is composed of a series of scenes of nature, opening with a desert landscape in sunrise. As the day continues, clouds are moving through the sky. In the middle of the picture is a constant golden frame, where Harris performs in. It appears throughout the whole video and she is surrounded by many lit candles. As the video ends, the sun goes down over the desert again. It received heavy rotation on MTV Europe.

Track listings

1993 version
 7-inch single
 Do You See the Light (Looking For) 7-inch (4:09) 
 Do You See the Light (Looking For) (Deep Ethno Dub 7-inch) (3:55)

 12-inch single
 Do You See the Light (Looking For) (12-inch) (6:39) 
 Do You See the Light (Looking For) (Dance 2 Trance Mix) (7:01) 
 Do You See the Light (Looking For) (Deep Ethno Dub) (6:09)

 CD single
 Do You See the Light (Looking For) (7-inch) 4:09
 Do You See the Light (Looking For) (Dance 2 Trance Mix) 8:01
 Do You See the Light (Looking For) (12-inch) 6:39

2002 version
 CD single
 Do You See the Light (Radio Edit) (2:57) 
 Do You See the Light (Original Mix)* (6:59) 
 Do You See the Light (Steve Murano Remix) (7:08)

 UK 12-inch single
 Do You See the Light (Original Mix)* 
 Do You See the Light (Steve Murano Remix) 
 Do You See the Light (Push Remix)

"Original Mix" refers to the original Snap Vs Plaything mix and not the 1992 or 1993 versions.

Charts

Weekly charts

Year-end charts

Release history

References

1992 songs
1993 singles
English-language German songs
Number-one singles in Finland
Snap! songs